Kuaiji (Chinese: /, romanized K'uai-chi in Wade–Giles), also spelled Guiji, is an old name of Shaoxing.

It may also refer to:

 Mount Xianglu near Shaoxing, formerly known as Mount Kuaiji
 Kuaiji Mountains, south of Shaoxing
 Kuaiji Commandery, a historical commandery around the mountain
 Suzhou, the initial capital of the commandery
 Kuaiji County, a former county around Shaoxing